Ann Patricia Barker (born 19 January 1952) is a former Australian politician. She was a Labor Party member of the Victorian Legislative Assembly from 1999 to 2014, representing the electorate of Oakleigh. She previously represented the electorate of Bentleigh from 1988 to 1992.

Barker was born in Tasmania. She worked as an electorate officer to former federal MP Joan Child before being elected to the Victorian Legislative Assembly seat of Bentleigh at the 1988 state election, succeeding retiring ALP member Gordon Hockley. She was seen as a potential ministerial candidate towards the end of her first term, but was twice overlooked by then-Premier Joan Kirner. These ambitions were to be short-lived, as she was one of many Labor members to be defeated amidst the party's landslide defeat at the 1992 state election, losing to Liberal Inga Peulich.

After her 1992 election defeat, Barker was employed as an advisor to federal MP Simon Crean, then a minister in the Keating government. She left Crean's office in 1996 to work as an office manager with the Victorian Court Information and Welfare Network, but returned to Crean's office the following year. She was the Labor candidate for the seat of Oakleigh at the 1996 election, but was very narrowly defeated by incumbent Liberal member Denise McGill. She was again the Labor candidate for the seat at the 1999 election, having resisted pressure to stand aside for star candidate Mary Delahunty, and amidst the party's statewide victory, succeeded in defeating McGill.

Barker was appointed Parliamentary Secretary for Training and Higher Education after the party's victory at the 2002 election. A relatively low-profile MP, she spoke less than only one other member of either house of parliament in 2004. In 2006, she was a vocal supporter of Martin Pakula's unsuccessful challenge to the preselection of her former employer, Simon Crean. She was appointed Deputy Speaker of the Legislative Assembly after the 2006 election.

References

1952 births
Australian Labor Party members of the Parliament of Victoria
Living people
Members of the Victorian Legislative Assembly
21st-century Australian politicians
21st-century Australian women politicians
Women members of the Victorian Legislative Assembly